The Opposition Party was a political party that came to prominence during the 1848–49 revolution in Hungary.

History

During the Hungarian Reform Era, several opposition circles appeared. Among the first was the National Circle from which later the Pest Circle split. When the two organizations newly merged, they formed the Opposition Circle which can be seen as the predecessor of the Opposition Party.

For the elections of the National Assembly in 1847, it was needed to establish a new political force. The Conservative Party was created in November 1846 by the Habsburg-loyal members of the National Assembly. This gave the final impuls to the József Eötvös-led centralists and the municipalists to aside controversies. After the preliminary party formation meeting on 15 November 1846, they officially announced the creation of the Opposition Party on the 15 March 1847 in Pest at the Opposition Conference. Lajos Batthyány was named as the president of the party.

On the party formation meeting, Lajos Kossuth read out the party program that he had written. At the end of the meeting, the famous Hungarian poet Sándor Petőfi declaimed his poem A nép nevében (In the name of the people). Ferenc Deák made the final version of the party program and named it Ellenzéki Nyilatkozat (Opposition Statement) which was accepted by the members.

After the party's victory in the 1848 March Revolution, it became power holder. The first government in the history of Hungary was formed from which the prime minister, Lajos Batthyány and five other ministers were members of the Opposition Party (Minister of Justice Ferenc Deák, Minister of the Interior Bertalan Szemere, Minister of Education József Eötvös, Minister of Finance Lajos Kossuth, Minister of Agriculture Gábor Klauzál). Two other ministers, István Széchenyi and Lázár Mészáros were independent and Pál Esterházy was a member of the Conservative Party.

Until the end of the summer, most of the important political rolls were in the hands of the members of the Opposition Party: they were in the ruling party and also in its opposition. The breakline lyed between the ruling moderates and the opposition formed by the radicals. To the latter belonged among others László Teleki, Pál Nyáry and László Madarász.

In 1849, the Conservative Party merged into the Opposition Party.

After the defeated revolution and the passive resistance of the 1850s, the newly revived Opposition party split into several directions. While Deák and Eötvös accepted the Ausgleich and they were the leaders of that on the Hungarian side, Kossuth and his followers opposed it. They wanted complete independence and rejected the Austro-Hungarian dualism.

The followers of Ferenc Deák established the Address Party and the followers of Lajos Kossuth created the Resolution Party in 1861.

List of notable members of the Opposition Party

 Lajos Batthyány, Prime Minister of Hungary
 Lajos Kossuth, Prime Minister of Hungary
 Károly Andrássy
 Pál Almásy, Speaker of the House of Representatives
 József Bajza, Hungarian poet
 Kázmér Batthyány, Minister of Foreign Affairs
 László Csány, Minister of Public Works and Transport
 Ferenc Deák ("The Wise Man of the Nation"), Hungarian statesman, Minister of Justice, founder of the Address Party and the Deák Party
 Menyhért Lónyay, Prime Minister of Hungary
 Gábor Klauzál, Minister of Agriculture, Industry and Trade
 István Gorove, Minister of Agriculture, Industry and Trade, later Minister of Public Works and Transport, and leader of the Liberal Party
 László Palóczy, Speaker of the House of Representatives
 Zsigmond Perényi, Speaker of the House of Magnates
 Sándor Petőfi, Hungarian poet, liberal revolutionary
 Ferenc Pulszky
 Bertalan Szemere, Hungarian poet, Prime Minister of Hungary
 László Teleki, later leader of the Resolution Party
 Ágoston Trefort, Minister of Religion and Education, President of the Hungarian Academy of Sciences
 Mihály Vörösmarty, Hungarian poet, dramatist
 Sebő Vukovics

Literature 
 Dezsényi Béla: A Nemzeti Kör a negyvenes évek irodalmi és hírlapi mozgalmaiban. In: Irodalomtörténeti Közlemények. 1953. p. 163-204.
 Deregnyei (Kossuth Lajos): A magyar politikai pártok értelmezése

References

 Hungarian Wikipedia
 A két óriás nem szenvedhette egymást (interjú Csorba László történésszel – Élet és Irodalom)

Defunct political parties in Hungary
Political parties established in 1847
1847 establishments in the Austrian Empire
1849 disestablishments in the Austrian Empire